Batenburg Castle (Kasteel Batenburg in Dutch) is located in the village of Batenburg, in the Gelderland province in the Netherlands. Construction is thought to have started on the castle in 1300. The castle is located on the northern edge of the village. It is surrounded by a moat.

The castle was rebuilt in 1600 on the foundations of an earlier structure; The present castle was destroyed by fire in 1795 and is now preserved as ruins: the ring wall with towers, the remains of three extended round towers with a basement underneath and the remains of the gatehouse. These are flanked by semicircular towers, all built with limestone brick. Batenburg Windmill was formerly owned by the castle.

The site is recognized as a Rijksmonument under number 8725.

References

Buildings and structures completed in the 14th century
Buildings and structures demolished in 1795
Castles in Gelderland
Rijksmonuments in Gelderland
Wijchen